Jang Na-ra (born March 18, 1981) is a South Korean singer and actress active in both the South Korean and Chinese entertainment industries since 2001. She starred in well-received television series Successful Story of a Bright Girl (2002), My Love Patzzi (2002), Wedding (2005), My Bratty Princess (2005), Confession Couple (2017) and The Last Empress (2018-2019).

Film

Television series

Documentary

Television Show

Hosting

Music video appearances

References

South Korean filmographies